Alexander Baart (born 30 April 1988) is a Dutch field hockey player of Belgian descent who plays as a defender or midfielder for Belgian club Antwerp.

Club career
He started playing at the age of 6 at Royal Antwerp HC in Belgium and in his final season with them in 2007 won the Belgian national title. As of the 2007-2008 season he was playing for the Dutch club Oranje Zwart. In 2014, 2015 and 2016 he won 3 consecutive Dutch national titles with his club. And in 2015 he also won the Euro Hockey League with his club.

On a club level he also represented the Uttar Pradesh Wizards in the first three seasons of the Hockey India League as well as in 2017. In the European club season of 2017–18, he played for Real Club de Polo de Barcelona. As of the 2017–18 season, he played for Braxgata in the Belgian club competition. In January 2020 it was announced he would return to Eindhoven to play for Oranje Zwart's successor Oranje-Rood in the 2020–21 season. After two seasons back in Eindhoven he returned to Belgium to play for his first club Antwerp.

International career
As a junior player, he played for the Belgian national team Boys Under 16 and won the European title with them. Later on, he switched to the Dutch national teams and won European silver and gold medals for the Dutch under-21 team and the silver medal at the Junior World Championship.

He played his first official match for the senior Dutch national men's team in 2007 against South Korea. He is the only player to be selected for the Dutch national team without ever having played in the Dutch competition prior to his debut. At the 2012 Summer Olympics, he competed for the national team in the men's tournament, winning the silver medal. 

With the national team, he won a gold medal in the first Hockey World League in 2014, silver at the World Cup that same year and a gold medal in 2015 at the European Championship. He participated in the Rio Olympics in 2016 where he made the semi-final. In August 2017 he extended his European title in Amsterdam beating his other homeland Belgium in the final. In June 2019, he was selected in the Netherlands squad for the 2019 EuroHockey Championship. They won the bronze medal by defeating Germany 4–0.

Honours

International
Netherlands
Olympic Silver Medal: 2012
EuroHockey Championship: 2015, 2017
Hockey World League: 2012–13

Club
Antwerp
 Belgian Hockey League: 2006–07

Oranje Zwart
 Euro Hockey League: 2014–15
 Hoofdklasse: 2013–14, 2014–15, 2015–16

Real Club de Polo
 Copa del Rey: 2017

References

External links
 

1988 births
Living people
Dutch male field hockey players
Belgian male field hockey players
Male field hockey defenders
Male field hockey midfielders
Field hockey players at the 2012 Summer Olympics
2014 Men's Hockey World Cup players
Field hockey players at the 2016 Summer Olympics
2018 Men's Hockey World Cup players
Olympic field hockey players of the Netherlands
Olympic silver medalists for the Netherlands
Olympic medalists in field hockey
People from Edegem
Medalists at the 2012 Summer Olympics
Oranje Zwart players
Real Club de Polo de Barcelona players
Men's Hoofdklasse Hockey players
División de Honor de Hockey Hierba players
Men's Belgian Hockey League players
HC Oranje-Rood players
Uttar Pradesh Wizards players
Sportspeople from Antwerp Province
21st-century Dutch people